Olgay Coşkun (born 9 February 1984 in Susurluk) is a Turkish footballer who plays for Nilüfer Erdemli.

On May 31, 2007, he transferred to Gençlerbirliği S.K. from Karşıyaka S.K.

References

External links

1984 births
Living people
People from Susurluk
Turkish footballers
Karşıyaka S.K. footballers
Hacettepe S.K. footballers
Kartalspor footballers
Süper Lig players
Association football midfielders

}